Ministry of Land, Infrastructure and Transport may refer to:

 Ministry of Land, Infrastructure, Transport and Tourism (Japan)
 Ministry of Land, Infrastructure and Transport (South Korea)